The Cleveland Orchestra, based in Cleveland, is one of the five American orchestras informally referred to as the "Big Five". Founded in 1918 by the pianist and impresario Adella Prentiss Hughes, the orchestra plays most of its concerts at Severance Hall. As of 2021, the incumbent music director is Franz Welser-Möst.

In October 2020 The New York Times called it "America's finest [orchestra], still", and in 2012 Gramophone Magazine ranked the Cleveland Orchestra number 7 on its list of the world's greatest orchestras.

History

Founding and early history (1918–1945)
The Cleveland Orchestra was founded in 1918 by music-aficionado Adella Prentiss Hughes, businessman John L. Severance, Father John Powers, music critic Archie Bell, and Russian-American violinist and conductor Nikolai Sokoloff, who would become the Orchestra’s first music director. A former pianist, Hughes served as a local music promoter and sponsored a series of “Symphony Orchestra Concerts” designed to bring top-notch orchestral music to Cleveland. In 1915, she helped found the Musical Arts Association, which presented Cleveland performances of the Ballets Russes in 1916 and Richard Wagner’s Siegfried at the Cleveland Indians’ League Park a few months later After a great deal of planning and fundraising, The Cleveland Orchestra’s inaugural concert was performed on December 11, 1918 at Grays Armory.

Three events occurred in 1921 that would prove significant in the young Orchestra’s development: First, the ensemble presented its inaugural children’s concert, which began a long-standing tradition of performing for young people from local schools. Second, the Women’s Committee of The Cleveland Orchestra was founded, a group which focused largely on internal affairs, including organization and branding; the Women’s Committee was also the driving force behind the creation of the Orchestra’s education-oriented Key Concerts series decades later. And third, the Orchestra performed its first concert in New York City that year, at the Hippodrome Theatre — a performance demonstrating that the Orchestra was committed to embarking on major activities from early in its existence. In 1922, the Orchestra again traveled to New York for its first concert at Carnegie Hall, a relationship between ensemble and venue that continues to this day. Later that year, the Orchestra performed its first radio broadcast and, in 1924, issued its first recording — a shortened version of Tchaikovsky’s 1812 Overture for the Brunswick label under Sokoloff’s direction.

By the end of the 1920s, the Musical Arts Association began planning for a permanent concert hall for the Orchestra. Board president John L. Severance and his wife, Elisabeth, pledged $1 million toward the construction of a new hall, and the groundbreaking ceremony took place in November 1929, a few months after Mrs. Severance’s death. On February 5, 1931, the Orchestra performed its inaugural concert at Severance Hall. Also that year, Lillian Baldwin created what became known as the “Cleveland Plan,” which was an initiative designed to build upon the Orchestra’s earlier children’s concerts and create a program that taught classical music to young people before they entered Severance Hall for a live performance.

In 1933, Sokoloff was replaced as the Orchestra’s music director by Polish conductor Artur Rodzinski, who had previously served as music director of the Los Angeles Philharmonic. During his decade-long tenure with The Cleveland Orchestra, Rodzinski advocated for the inclusion of staged opera at Severance Hall. The first of these productions was featured during the 1933–34 season, when the Orchestra performed Wagner’s Tristan und Isolde. In 1935, the Orchestra presented the United States’ premiere of Dmitri Shostakovich’s controversial Lady Macbeth of the Mtsensk District at Severance Hall and, later in the season, took the production to New York’s Metropolitan Opera. Four years later, in 1939, the Orchestra added to its growing legacy by establishing the Cleveland Summer Orchestra and performing pops concerts at Cleveland’s Public Hall. On December 11, 1939, The Cleveland Orchestra celebrated the anniversary of its founding by releasing its first recording on the Columbia label.

Rodzinski departed Cleveland in 1943 and was replaced by Erich Leinsdorf, a young conductor from the Metropolitan Opera. However, Leinsdorf’s tenure with The Cleveland Orchestra was brief: He was drafted into the United States Armed Forces shortly after his appointment, which diminished his artistic control. Although Leinsdorf was honorably discharged from the military in September 1944, his time away from the podium had required the Musical Arts Association to employ a number of guest conductors from 1943 until 1945, including the Hungarian George Szell, a former colleague of Leinsdorf’s at the Met who impressed audiences at Severance Hall during two weeks of performances. Leinsdorf lost much of his public support and, though still under contract, submitted his resignation in December 1945. The following year Szell was appointed as The Cleveland Orchestra’s fourth music director.

George Szell (1946–1970)
From the start of his tenure, Szell had a simple goal — transforming The Cleveland Orchestra into “America’s finest” symphonic ensemble and developing an orchestra that was “second to none.” He spent much of his early time in Cleveland changing personnel in an effort to find musicians who were capable of creating his ideal orchestral sound. Szell’s stringent standards and expectations for musical precision were reflected in his contract with the Musical Arts Association: He was given complete artistic control over programming, scheduling, personnel, and recording.

In the 1950s and ‘60s, Szell was instrumental in the achievement of several Cleveland Orchestra milestones. First, he led the Orchestra on its first European tour, in 1957, across Europe and behind the Iron Curtain. Next, Szell pushed to change Severance Hall’s acoustic properties, which he felt were too “dry.” Major renovations were made during the 1958–59 season, including the construction of the “Szell Shell,” which was designed to project the Orchestra’s sound in a manner that created better balance among musicians and a clearer string section. A second European tour took place in 1965, and two years later the ensemble became the first American orchestra to be invited to three premiere festivals, in Salzburg, Lucerne, and Edinburgh, in the same summer. Szell also oversaw the opening of the Orchestra’s summer home, Blossom Music Center, in 1968, which provided the ensemble’s musicians with year-round employment. After 24 years, Szell’s time with The Cleveland Orchestra came to an abrupt and unexpected end: shortly after he led the ensemble on a tour of the Far East during the spring of 1970, which included stops in Japan, Korea, and Alaska, Szell died.

Two days after Szell’s death, the Orchestra played its scheduled program at Blossom Music Center with Aaron Copland taking the podium as guest conductor. However, now the Musical Arts Association had to appoint a new music director for the first time in nearly two and a half decades. Initially, Louis Lane, one of Szell’s assistant conductors, was appointed resident conductor and Pierre Boulez, who had been named principal guest conductor in 1969, was appointed musical advisor.

Lorin Maazel (1972–1982)
Eventually, the board selected Lorin Maazel as The Cleveland Orchestra’s fifth music director — a tenure that would begin in 1972. Remarkably, the first time Maazel conducted the Orchestra was at the age of 13 in 1943, when he led the ensemble during a concert at Cleveland’s Public Hall. Many critics were initially unimpressed with Maazel’s musical interpretations, which they believed were too emotionally charged to follow Szell’s razor-crisp style. But soon Maazel was lifted by an endorsement from Philadelphia Orchestra conductor Eugene Ormandy and the promise of a new collaboration with Decca Records on Prokofiev’s Romeo and Juliet, which proved to be the spark Maazel needed to jumpstart his Cleveland Orchestra career. During the 1973–74 season, Maazel led the Orchestra on a tour of Australia and New Zealand, where the ensemble was joined by guest conductors Stanislaw Skrowaczewski and (former Cleveland Orchestra music director) Erich Leinsdorf. The Orchestra also played a series of concerts in Japan. During the following season, the Orchestra released its first commercial recording of an opera, George Gershwin’s Porgy and Bess, which was also Decca’s first opera recording in the United States. Soon Maazel emerged as a candidate for the directorship of the Vienna State Opera and he arranged to leave Cleveland after the 1981–82 season. Before his departure, however, Maazel helped to introduce the Orchestra’s landmark Martin Luther King Jr. Celebration Concerts in January 1980, which remain an annual tradition to this day. On May 15, 1982, Maazel conducted his final performance at Severance Hall followed by a short tour of New York and New Haven, where he led concerts featuring Giuseppe Verdi’s Requiem, which had been his debut piece with the Orchestra in 1972.

Christoph von Dohnányi (1984–2002)
During the search for Maazel’s successor, German conductor Christoph von Dohnányi took the podium for a series of concerts at Severance Hall in December 1981. It didn’t take long for the Musical Arts Association to realize that The Cleveland Orchestra had found its next music director in Dohnányi; he was named music director designate in 1982, and he officially began his tenure two years later. During the pair of seasons between Maazel and Dohnányi, a number of guest conductors took turns leading the Orchestra, including Erich Leinsdorf, who labeled himself the “bridge between the regimes.”

Because of Dohnányi’s connections with Teldec, Decca/London, and Telarc, his Cleveland Orchestra tenure began with the promise of more recording projects. He also staged a large production of Mozart’s The Magic Flute at Blossom Music Center in 1985, which was lauded as “the Ohio musical event of the summer” by The Columbus Dispatch. In addition, Dohnányi oversaw the hiring of Indonesian conductor Jahja Ling, who would lead the newly-established Cleveland Orchestra Youth Orchestra. International touring continued under Dohnányi with visits to Asia and Europe, including the development of a long-standing relationship with the Salzburg Festival beginning in 1990.

To celebrate The Cleveland Orchestra’s 75th anniversary, Dohnányi led performances of Richard Wagner’s Ring cycle at Severance Hall across the 1992–93 and 1993–94 seasons, and a subsequent recording project of Wagner’s Das Rheingold and Die Walküre. The Orchestra also began a fundraising campaign for the renovation of Severance Hall, which included the removal of the “Szell Shell,” a return of the ensemble’s E.M. Skinner organ to the stage, and a facilities expansion designed to enhance the experience of concertgoers. During these renovations, the Orchestra performed concerts for its hometown audiences at the Allen Theatre in Cleveland’s Playhouse Square. On January 8, 2000, Dohnányi led a gala concert celebrating the re-opening of Severance Hall that was broadcast live on local television by Cleveland’s WVIZ. 

At the conclusion of Dohnányi’s contract, in 2002, he was named The Cleveland Orchestra’s music director laureate and succeeded as music director by Austrian conductor Franz Welser-Möst.

Franz Welser-Möst (2002–present)
Since signing to become the Orchestra’s seventh music director, Welser-Möst and the Musical Arts Association have extended his contract several times — with his most recent contract keeping him on the podium until 2027. During his tenure, Welser-Möst has overseen many of The Cleveland Orchestra’s residencies, outreach programs, and expansion activities. He leads the Orchestra’s ongoing residencies at the Musikverein in Vienna and at the Lucerne Festival, both of which began with Welser-Möst’s first European tour in 2003. In addition, under Welser-Möst The Cleveland Orchestra began an annual residency at Miami’s Carnival Center for the Performing Arts — later renamed the Adrienne Arsht Center for the Performing Arts — in 2007. Over the past decade, the Orchestra has continued to present operas and a selection of film screenings with live musical accompaniment. On September 29, 2018, Welser-Möst led the ensemble in a gala concert at Severance Hall celebrating the Orchestra’s 100th anniversary — a presentation that was later featured on America’s preeminent arts television series, Great Performances, during an exclusive U.S. broadcast on PBS. 

In addition to a vast catalog of recordings created with the ensemble's music directors, the orchestra has made many recordings with guest conductors Vladimir Ashkenazy, Oliver Knussen, Kurt Sanderling, Yoel Levi, Riccardo Chailly, George Benjamin, Roberto Carnevale, Riccardo Muti, Michael Tilson Thomas, and Louis Lane (the orchestra's longtime Associate Conductor). Past assistant conductors of the Cleveland Orchestra include Matthias Bamert, James Levine, Alan Gilbert, James Judd and Michael Stern.

In early 2020, the orchestra suspended a planned tour of Europe and Abu Dhabi, and live concerts at Severance Hall and Blossom Music Center due to the COVID-19 pandemic. That October, the orchestra launched the Adella App, a streaming service including historical and newly created content. Access to the service was free to season subscribers and $35 per month for non-subscribers.  A limited in-person return to concerts was announced for Blossom Music Center for the Summer of 2021, with a return to Severance Hall planned for October.

Music directors
 Nikolai Sokoloff (1918–1933)
 Artur Rodziński (1933–1943)
 Erich Leinsdorf (1943–1946)
 George Szell (1946–1970)
 Pierre Boulez (musical advisor; 1970–1972)
 Lorin Maazel (1972–1982)
 Christoph von Dohnányi (1984–2002)
 Franz Welser-Möst (2002–present)

Daniel R. Lewis Young Composer Fellows
 Marc-André Dalbavie (1999–2000)
 Matthias Pintscher (2001–2003)
 Susan Botti (2003–2005)
 Julian Anderson (2005–2007)
 Johannes Maria Staud (2007–2009)
 Jörg Widmann (2009–2011)
 Sean Shepherd (2011–2013)
 Ryan Wigglesworth (2013–2015)
 Anthony Cheung (2015–2017)
 Bernd Richard Deutsch (2018–present)

See also
Cleveland Orchestra Discography
Cleveland Orchestra Youth Orchestra
Cleveland Philharmonic Orchestra
Cleveland Women's Orchestra
Cleveland Chamber Symphony
CityMusic Cleveland
Red (an orchestra)
The Contemporary Youth Orchestra

References

Further reading

External links

The Cleveland Orchestra Official website
 from the Telarc website.

Musical groups from Cleveland
Musical groups established in 1918
Tourist attractions in Cleveland
Music of Cleveland
1918 establishments in Ohio
Orchestras based in Ohio